Lazarata, is a village in the northern part of the island of Lefkada, Greece. It was the seat of the former municipality of Sfakiotes. Lazarata is located 7 km southwest of the main town of Lefkada and 3 km northeast of Karya.

Population

References

Populated places in Lefkada (regional unit)